Nielsen may refer to:

Business
 Nielsen Gallery, an American commercial art gallery
 Nielsen Holdings, global information, data, and measurement company
 Nielsen Corporation, a marketing research firm
 Nielsen Audio, formerly Arbitron, which measures radio listenership
 Nielsen Broadcast Data Systems, a service also known as BDS that tracks monitored radio, television, and internet airplay of songs
 Nielsen Media Research, the company that creates the Nielsen ratings
 Nielsen ratings, a rating system used to gauge audience measurement of television programming habits in the United States
 Nielsen Norman Group, a computer user interface and user experience consulting firm

Other uses
 Nielsen (surname), including a list of people
 Nielsen (crater), a lunar impact crater on the Oceanus Procellarum
 Nielsen–Olesen vortex, a point-like object localized in two spatial dimensions or a classical solution of field theory with the same property
 Nielsen fixed-point theorem
 Nielsen Fjord
 Nielsen Glacier
 Nielsen Park She-Oak

See also
Neilsen (disambiguation)
Neilson (disambiguation)
Nielson
Nilsen
 Nilsson